Novellara (Reggiano:  or ) is a town and comune in the province of Reggio Emilia, Emilia-Romagna, Italy and has a population of 13,670.

History
The current name comes from the medieval Nubilaria, when the surrounding terrain was mostly covered by marshes, which favoured the formation of recurring fogs.

The town was the seat of the Gonzaga family from the 13th century: here Guido Gonzaga, in the early 14th century, created an effectively independent lordship, which later evolved into the County of Novellara and Bagnolo, including grossly what is now the communal territory of Novellara and the nearby Bagnolo in Piano.

After the Gonzaga's end, in 1728, the town passed to the Este of the Duchy of Modena, whose history Novellara followed until 1859, when it was annexed to the newly unified Italy.

Main sights
The Jesuit Convent
Chiesa Collegiata di Santo Stefano
The Rocca Gonzaga ("Gonzaga Castle"). This was built by Feltrino Gonzaga starting from 1350, most likely over a pre-existing fortifications from Lombard times.
The Casino di Sotto and Casino di Sopra, summer residences of the Gonzagas. The Gonzaga Museum houses a rare 16th century vases collection.
The main square (Piazza Unità d'Italia) with the Church of St. Stephen, important work by Lelio Orsi.

In addition to this, Novellara is also home to the second largest gurdwara in Europe. This reflects the presence of a very large Sikh community, living in Novellara and nearby places, where they work mainly in cattle farms and dairies, where Parmigiano Reggiano is made.

As in other towns of the region, (e.g. Bologna), streets are lined with characteristic arcades, intended to offer shade in summer and shelter from rain or snow.

Famous people

Maria Teresa Cybo-Malaspina, duchess of Modena, Reggio, Massa and Carrara, was born here in 1725.
Augusto Daolio, (1947-1992) singer and founder of the Nomadi band.
Vittorio Marchi, (1851–1908), histologist
Lelio Orsi, 16th century painter
Luciano Pigozzi, film actor
Giaches de Wert, composer of the Renaissance, lived and raised his family here from about 1550 to 1565.

Baldassare Castiglione, famous humanist philosopher who was a count in Novellara.

Twin towns - sister cities
Novellara is twinned with:

 Nový Jičín, Czech Republic
 Neve Shalom, Israel
 Sancti Spíritus, Cuba
 Santa Gertrudes, Brazil
 Santo Stefano di Cadore, Italy

References 

Cities and towns in Emilia-Romagna
Castles in Italy